Steganomma is a genus of beetle in the family Carabidae.  It contains the following species:

 Steganomma carteri Baehr, 2006
 Steganomma doddi Baehr, 2006
 Steganomma porcatum W. J. MacLeay, 1887

References

Scaritinae